The Green Carriage is a 1967 Soviet biographical drama film directed by Yan Frid and starring Natalya Tenyakova, Vladimir Chestnokov and Igor Dmitriev. It portrays the life of the nineteenth century stage actress Varvara Asenkova.

Partial cast
 Natalya Tenyakova as Varvara Asenkova 
 Vladimir Chestnokov as Sosnitski
 Igor Dmitriev as Dyur
 Aleksandr Susnin as Martynov  
 Gleb Florinskiy
 Aleksandr Borisov 
 Lidiya Shtykan 
 Tatyana Piletskaya 
 Igor Ozerov 
 Irina Gubanova as Masha
 Aleksandr Sokolov 
 Yulian Panich 
 Geliy Sysoev 
 Victor Kostetskiy as Perepelsky (prototype - Nikolay Nekrasov)
 Valentina Kovel

References

Bibliography 
 Peter Cowie & Derek Elley. World Filmography: 1967. Fairleigh Dickinson University Press, 1977.

External links 
 

1967 films
1960s biographical drama films
Soviet biographical drama films
Russian biographical drama films
1960s Russian-language films
Films directed by Yan Frid
Films set in the 19th century
1967 drama films